The Samanes del Santa Marta BBC  were a baseball team that played in the Venezuelan Professional Baseball League during the 1954–1955 season. The team represented the city of La Guaira, Vargas, Venezuela, and played its home games at Estadio Universitario de Caracas.

Santa Marta was managed by former big leaguer Red Kress and entered the league as a replacement for the departed Sabios de Vargas, being part of a four-team league that included the Leones del Caracas, Navegantes del Magallanes and Patriotas de Venezuela.

The team was clearly overmatched, finishing in last place with an 18-33 record, 14½ games out of first place. Santa Marta never reached a high level of popularity, failing to encourage a significant fan support, and folded after its first season.

The franchise would be replaced by the Industriales de Valencia in the 1955-1956 tournament.

Selected players
 
Vern Benson
Emilio Cueche
Hank Foiles
Joe Frazier
Bill Kennedy
Clem Koshorek
Julián Ladera
Jesús Mora
Joe Pignatano
Dave Pope
Bob Smith
Gene Stephens
Bill Werle

Sources
Gutiérrez, Daniel; Alvarez, Efraim; Gutiérrez (h), Daniel (2006). La Enciclopedia del Béisbol en Venezuela. LVBP, Caracas. 
Gutiérrez, Daniel; González, Javier (1992). Numeritos del béisbol profesional venezolano (1946-1992). LVBP, Caracas.

External links
PuraPelota.com – Santa Marta (1954–1955)
es.Wikipedia.org – Liga Venezolana de Béisbol Profesional

1954 establishments in Venezuela
Defunct baseball teams in Venezuela
La Guaira
Baseball teams established in 1954
Vargas (state)